Teratopora is a genus of moths in the family Erebidae.

Species
 Teratopora acosma (Turner, 1899)
 Teratopora agramma Hampson, 1914
 Teratopora haplodes Meyrick, 1889
 Teratopora unifascia (Rothschild, 1912)

References
Natural History Museum Lepidoptera generic names catalog

Lithosiina
Moth genera